The William Beaumont Prize is a scientific award given by the American Gastroenterological Association (AGA) to scientists who have "made a major contribution (a single accomplishment or series of accomplishments) that has significantly advanced care of patients with digestive diseases through clinical or translational research". Recipients receive a $5,000 honorarium. The prize was initiated in 1976.

Recipients
 1976: R. A. Gregory, Viktor Mutt
 1979: Bengt Borgstrom, Alan Hofmann
 1982: Morton Grossman, Sir James Black
 1985: George Sachs
 1985: John G. Forte
 1988: Saul Krugman, Mario Rizzetto, Jesse Summers
 1991: Thomas Starzl
 1994: Daniel W. Bradley, Michael Houghton, Qui-Lim Choo, George Kuo
 1997: Bert Vogelstein
 2000: Martin C. Carey, Donald Small
 2006: Barry Marshall
 2009: Warren Strober
 2012: Richard Blumberg, Hans Clevers
 2015: C. Richard Boland
 2016: Anna Suk-Fong Lok
 2017: David Ahlquist
 2018: Mary K. Estes
 2019: Timothy C. Wang

See also

 List of medicine awards

References

Medicine awards
Awards established in 1976